A spiff is a small, immediate bonus for a sale.

Spiff, SPIFF, or SPIF may also refer to:

Organizations
 The Spacecraft Planetary Imaging Facility (SPIF) at Cornell University, a NASA Regional Planetary Image Facility

Technology
 Spiff (UNIX), a text comparison tool
 XSPF (XML Shareable Playlist Format), a data format
 JPEG Still Picture Interchange File Format (SPIFF), an image data format
 SPIFFS, (Serial Peripheral Interface Flash File System), a method for creating a file system in NOR-type flash memory

Fiction
 Spaceman Spiff (Calvin and Hobbes), fantasy identity of title character in the comic strip
 Spiff and Hercules, comic strip (Pif et Hercule in French)

Other
 SPIF (patent identification format)

See also
Spliff